Poruchikovsky is a rural locality (a khutor) in Trostyanskoye Rural Settlement, Yelansky District, Volgograd Oblast, Russia. The population was 51 as of 2010.

Geography 
Poruchikovsky is located on Khopyorsko-Buzulukskaya Plain, on the left bank of the Buzuluk River, 32 km southwest of Yelan (the district's administrative centre) by road. Novobuzuluksky is the nearest rural locality.

References 

Rural localities in Yelansky District